Latino America Unida, Lambda Alpha Upsilon Fraternity, Inc. ( or LAU, also known as Condors) is a Latino oriented Greek letter intercollegiate fraternity founded on December 10, 1985 at the State University of New York at Buffalo.

Founding fathers
The founding fathers represented various ethnic backgrounds, demonstrating the diversity of the Latin American community. In the fall of 1985 at the University at Buffalo, sixteen young men decided to form a support group that would provide a social and cultural outlet for students of Latin American descent. The university's Greek system lacked an organization dedicated to the needs of the Latino community. To meet those needs, the group chose to pursue recognition as the first Latino-oriented Greek-letter organization on campus.

The founding fathers were:
 Antonio Adorno
 José Betances
 Miguel Buitrago
 Manuel Cáceres
 José Chiu
 Ronald Ellín
 Daniel Figueroa III
 Victor Gutiérrez
 Justo León
 Julio Martínez Jr.
 José Núñez
 Antonio Rodríguez
 Daryl Salas
 Manny Sánchez
 José Soto
 Simón Vélez

Chapters

Undergraduate chapters
Lambda Alpha Upsilon reserves the Lambda chapter designation for deceased Hermanos. Iterations beginning with the letter Lambda are reserved for alumni chapters as described below.

Alumni chapters
The alumni chapters of Lambda Alpha Upsilon consist of working professionals and graduate level students, whom were inducted as undergraduate members and are established in the workforce or continuing their education while deciding to remain active within the fraternity. Lambda Alpha Upsilon also inducts interested men with at least a bachelor's degree into one of the alumni chapters through the Graduate Induction Process.  Lambda Alpha Upsilon officially recognizes the following alumni chapters:

Affiliations
The fraternity is a founding member of the National Association of Latino Fraternal Organizations (NALFO).

See also
List of social fraternities and sororities

References

External links
 Official website

Latino fraternities and sororities
Student organizations established in 1985
Hispanic and Latino organizations
National Association of Latino Fraternal Organizations
Student societies in the United States
1985 establishments in New York (state)